Yoo Jae-ha (June 6, 1962 – November 1, 1987) was a South Korean singer and songwriter. His first and only album, Because I Love You was released through Seoul Records in 1987. Yoo died in a car accident months later from the album release at age 25. Even though he died with only one album, Yoo Jae-ha's music has a great legacy in South Korea, and it is credited with exerting tremendous influence in Korean popular music.

Biography 
Yoo was born in Andong, North Gyeongsang Province in South Korea. He attended Hanyang University, where he studied music composition and began playing the keyboard for Cho Yong-pil's band, The Great Birth in 1984.

After graduating from college, he worked with Kim Hyun-sik for Kim's first album Spring Summer Fall Winter, and in 1986 he wrote the song "Hidden Road" from Kim's 3rd album, which contributed to the creation of Kim Hyun-sik's early alum. The following year, in 1987, he released his first and only album, Because I Love You, and died in a car accident on November 1 of the same year at the age of 25.

Legacy
Following Yoo's death in 1987, his family established the Yoo Jae-ha Scholarship Foundation, followed in 1989 by the Yoo Jae-ha Music Contest. Winners of the contest include You Hee-yeol, Kim Yeon-woo, and Bang Si-hyuk.

As of 2011, Because I Love You has sold more than 2 million copies. The album was remastered and re-released on vinyl in 2014. In 2018, Because I Love You was ranked the best pop album in South Korean history by a panel of music critics and music industry experts in collaboration with The Hankyoreh and Melon.

Discography

Studio albums

References

External links
 Yoo Jae-ha Music Scholarship

1962 births
1987 deaths
20th-century South Korean male singers
South Korean pianists
South Korean guitarists
Road incident deaths in South Korea
Hanyang University alumni
People from Andong
Male pianists
20th-century guitarists
20th-century pianists
South Korean male singer-songwriters